Gary L. Cross (born May 19, 1955) is an American politician. He is a former member of the Missouri House of Representatives, having served from 2011 to 2019. He is a member of the Republican Party.

References

1955 births
21st-century American politicians
Living people
Republican Party members of the Missouri House of Representatives